Pendleton Township may refer to:

 Pendleton Township, Jefferson County, Illinois
 Pendleton Township, St. Francois County, Missouri

Township name disambiguation pages